WFKX (95.7 FM, "96 Kix") is a radio station broadcasting an urban adult contemporary music format. Licensed to Henderson, Tennessee, United States, the station is currently owned by Southern Stone Communications, LLC, and features programming from Westwood One.

References

External links
 
 

FKX
Urban adult contemporary radio stations in the United States